John Hrankaj, publicly known as Johnny Hannon (November 10, 1908, Upper Darby, Pennsylvania – May 20, 1935, Speedway, Indiana) was an American racecar driver and boxer. He was killed while testing a car for the 1935 Indianapolis 500, in his first year of attempting to qualify for the race. He had previously had success on the dirt track circuit.

Racing career
In 1934 Hannon was the AAA Eastern Circuit dirt track racing champion. Among his victories was the first auto race ever held at the Stafford, Conn. Fairgrounds, now Stafford Motor Speedway. Hannon piloted Gus Strupp's Big Car to win the American Automobile Association sanctioned race on October 14, 1934. 

In 1935 he was to attempt to qualify for the Indianapolis 500, but lost control of his car in practice and went over the Northwest wall. The crash occurred on his first lap at racing speed. He was thrown from the vehicle, which then landed on top of him, causing his immediate death. After a series of deaths in the 1935 race, Speedway officials began what is now known as the Rookie Orientation Program for first-year Indianapolis 500 drivers, and a related Refresher Test for drivers who have not raced in an INDYCAR oval race in the past 11 months.

He was inducted into the National Sprint Car Hall of Fame in 2006.

Personal life
Hannon was born in the United States but grew up in Germany. Before racing he was a professional boxer, winning 13 of 14 bouts. At the time of his death he was married with a three-year-old daughter and living in Conshohocken, Pennsylvania.

References

Racing drivers who died while racing
Sports deaths in Indiana
1935 deaths
1908 births
People from Conshohocken, Pennsylvania
People from Upper Darby Township, Pennsylvania
Racing drivers from Pennsylvania
Boxers from Pennsylvania
American male boxers